Christy Rowe Estlund (born Christy Lenora Rowe; July 5, 1973) is an American former soccer player who played as a midfielder, making one appearance for the United States women's national team.

Career
Rowe Estlund played for the Apple Valley Eagles in high school, where she won the Athena Award as a senior in 1991 and was included in the All-State selection in three seasons. She also played for the Minnesota Thunder Academy club team, and participated in track and field, where she was a two-time All-State selection. In college, she played for the UConn Huskies from 1991 to 1995, having redshirted during the 1994 season due to a torn ACL. She was an All-American in 1995, and was named to the Big East First-Team All-Conference the same year. She was included in the ISAA National Senior Recognition Team, the NSCAA/Adidas All-Northeast Region, and the NEWISA All-New England selection in 1995. She also received the UConn Club Outstanding Senior Athlete Award in 1996. In total, she scored 22 goals and recorded 26 assists for the Huskies.

Rowe Estlund made her only international appearance for the United States on January 18, 1996 in a friendly match against Ukraine. She came on as a substitute in the 81st minute for Michelle Akers, with the match finishing as a 6–0 win.

In club soccer, Rowe Estlund played for the Minnesota Lightning in 1996. In 1998, she joined German first-division club Tus Niederkirchen in the Frauen-Bundesliga. She later joined fellow Bundesliga club 1. FC Saarbrücken, making 13 appearances for the team in the 2000–01 season.

Rowe Estlund was inducted into the Apple Valley High School Athletic Hall of Fame in 1996. She has coached youth soccer following her playing career.

Personal life
Rowe Estlund is a native of Apple Valley, Minnesota. She was married to Mark Jeffrey Estlund in February 1996.

Career statistics

International

References

External links
 
 Profile at Soccerdonna.de
 Profile at DFB.de

1973 births
Living people
People from Anoka County, Minnesota
Soccer players from Minnesota
American women's soccer players
American women's soccer coaches
United States women's international soccer players
American expatriate women's soccer players
American expatriate soccer players in Germany
Women's association football midfielders
UConn Huskies women's soccer players
1. FC Saarbrücken (women) players
Frauen-Bundesliga players
People from Apple Valley, Minnesota
USL W-League (1995–2015) players
Apple Valley High School (Minnesota) alumni
1. FFC 08 Niederkirchen players